Sarcoplasmic reticulum histidine-rich calcium-binding protein is a protein that in humans is encoded by the HRC gene.

Function 

Histidine-rich calcium-binding protein is a luminal sarcoplasmic reticulum protein of 165 kD identified by its ability to bind low-density lipoprotein with high affinity

References

Further reading